The Ragland House is a historic house at 1617 South Center Street in Little Rock, Arkansas.  It is a -story wood-frame structure, with asymmetrical massing characteristic of the Queen Anne period.  Its exterior is elaborately decorated with bands of cut shingles on the second level, and a bulbed turret at one corner.  A single-story porch wraps around the tower to the side, with a jigsawn valance and Stick style balustrade.  Built about 1891–92, it is unusual as an early work of architect Charles L. Thompson, who is better known for more Colonial Revival designs. The house was built for Mr. and Mrs. William Ragland.  After the Raglands moved, Mrs. Ragland's parents, Edmond and Henriette Urguhart lived there until his death in 1905.

See also
National Register of Historic Places listings in Little Rock, Arkansas

References

Houses on the National Register of Historic Places in Arkansas
Houses completed in 1908
Houses in Little Rock, Arkansas
National Register of Historic Places in Little Rock, Arkansas
Historic district contributing properties in Arkansas
1908 establishments in Arkansas